Blocker is a surname. Notable people with the surname include:

Dan Blocker (1928–1972),  American actor and Korean War veteran
 Darrell Blocker, nicknamed "The Spy Whisperer", American CIA agent
Dirk Blocker (born 1957) American actor
Terry Blocker (born 1959), American baseball player